The 1982–83 Yugoslav Cup was the 35th season of the top football knockout competition in SFR Yugoslavia, the Yugoslav Cup, also known as the "Marshal Tito Cup" (Kup Maršala Tita), since its establishment in 1946.

The 1981–82 winners Red Star failed to retain the trophy as they were knocked out in the second round by Rijeka. Previous season's runners-up Dinamo Zagreb and Sarajevo reached the tournament final, in which Dinamo won their 7th cup title by beating Sarajevo 3–2 through goals by Zlatko Kranjčar and Snješko Cerin. This was their second major silverware won under the guidance of Miroslav Blažević, with whom they previously won the 1981–82 Yugoslav First League championship, their first league title in 24 years.

Surprise of the tournament were the Rijeka-based minnows Orijent who managed to reach the quarter-finals, where they were knocked on penalties after holding the eventual runners-up Sarajevo to a 0–0 draw.

Calendar
The Yugoslav Cup was a tournament for which clubs from all tiers of the football pyramid were eligible to enter. In addition, amateur teams put together by individual Yugoslav People's Army garrisons and various factories and industrial plants were also encouraged to enter, which meant that each cup edition could have several thousands of teams in its preliminary stages. These teams would play through a number of qualifying rounds before reaching the first round proper, in which they would be paired with top-flight teams.

The cup final was played on 24 May, traditionally scheduled to coincide with Youth Day celebrated on 25 May, a national holiday in Yugoslavia which also doubled as the official commemoration of Josip Broz Tito's birthday.

First round
In the following tables winning teams are marked in bold; teams from outside top level are marked in italic script.

Second round

Quarter-finals

Semi-finals

Final

The 1983 Yugoslav Cup Final was contested by Dinamo Zagreb and Sarajevo at the Red Star Stadium in Belgrade. Dinamo Zagreb won 3–2, with two goals by Zlatko Kranjčar and one from Snješko Cerin. Dinamo had reached the final eleven times previously, winning six titles (1951, 1960, 1963, 1965, 1969, 1980). It also proved to be their last Yugoslav Cup win as they never repeated the feat until the competition was made defunct in 1991. For Sarajevo, this was their second appearance in the final (having lost the 1967 final to Hajduk Split), and was also their last final appearance.

This was one of the trophies won by Dinamo in their successful spell in the early 1980s, which include winning the 1981–82 Yugoslav First League and the 1979–80 Yugoslav Cup, and was the second major silverware won by Dinamo under the guidance of Miroslav Blažević.

Match details

See also
1982–83 Yugoslav First League
1982–83 Yugoslav Second League

External links
1982–83 cup season details at Rec.Sport.Soccer Statistics Foundation
1983 cup final details at Rec.Sport.Soccer Statistics Foundation

Yugoslav Cup seasons
Cup
Yugo